May refer to:
 Common ethanol fuel mixtures
 effective dose (pharmacology)